Munshi Mohammad Meherullah (26 December 18611907) was a Bengali Islamic scholar, poet and social reformer. He is best known for his oratory and writing on Islam and comparative religion and his efforts has been compared to Raja Ram Mohan Roy's defense of Hinduism against anti-Hindu views expounded by Christian missionaries in India.

Early life 
Meherullah was born in 1861, to a Bengali Muslim family of Munshis in Kaliganj under Jhenaidah subdivision, Jessore District of the Bengal Presidency. He learnt Bengali at a local school until the untimely death of his father, Munshi Muhammad Warith, when he was around 10 years old. He further continued his education under the guidance of Moulvi Ismail Sahib, with the financial help of his maternal family.  He learned Arabic and Persian during these years. From another teacher, Munshi Musabuddin, he learned Urdu. With his vast knowledge of languages and the Quran, he became not only an important figure in his local community but someone who could converse with members of elite households in Dhaka and Calcutta. The elite spoke and wrote in different languages, depending on where they resided and who they were. He was a polyglot, visionary and a channel for communication between these people of different socio-economic classes. Interestingly, along with everything else, Meherullah was a humble businessman too. After doing a government job for a short while, he got trained as a tailor and used his business not only to support his family but to stay in touch with his community.

Religious conversions
During his lifetime, Christian missionaries moved into disaster struck rural parts of Bengal and started conversion of Muslims with the promise of hospitals, food and education. The salvation that the missionaries provided, improved lives but at the cost of having to give up on one's beliefs.

Young Meherullah was initially attracted to Christianity, seeing the charitable efforts of the Missionaries. Muhammad Abdul Majid mentions this in Chotoder Munshi Mohammad Meher Ullah. According to Majid, Meherullah became a Christian, moved to Darjeeling and lived under the patronage of Christian missionaries. There, he studied not only the Bible but the books written by Muslim dais and decided to revert to Islam and shed light on the beauty of Islam to the people who were converted with misinformation used to vilify Islam .

Religious activism 
Munshi Mohammad Meherullah, returned to Jessore District and with his re-converted disciple Munshi Jamiruddin, adopted oratory method known as bahas (disputation) and sought to refute Christian missionaries. He was able to re-convert numerous Muslims who had been converted to Christianity.  He established Madrasaye Karamatia and Islam Dharmottejika Sabha in 1889 at Manoharpur village in Jessore. He contributed regularly to Muslim newspapers like the Sudhakar and Islam Pracharak published from Kolkata.

According to Kenneth W. Jones, no other Muslim preacher contributed to polemical literature in that period. It should be noted, while debating Christian missionaries, Meherullah did not vilify them. He called for intra- communal harmony.

Also, among his other major contributions, he strived to teach the Muslim population not to adopt primitive ideas from their neighboring Hindu society, which was opposed to the remarriage of widows.

Notable works 
Munshi Meherullah wrote at least 10 books between 1886 and 1908, which include
 Isayee Ba Khristani Dhoka  Bhanjan 
 Khristiya Dharmer Asarata (The hollowness of the Christian religion, 1887),
 Bidhabagavjana O Bisadbhandar (Sufferings of Widows, 1894),
 Meherul Islam (1897);
 Hindu Dharma Rahasya O Devalila (1898, 2 editions)
 Mussalman O Christian Tarkayuddha (Muslim and Christian Debates, 1908; 2 editions).
 Rodde  Khrishtian O Dlaliul Islam
 Babu Ishanchandra Mandal and Charles French er Eslam Grahan (Embracing of Islam by Babu Ishanchandra Mandal and Charles French),
 Slokmala (Compilation of verses)

Death and evaluation 
He died on 7 May 1907.
Professor Abdul Hai, remarked "Meherullah proved to be the Ram Mohan of the Muslims of Bengal — Ram Mohan saved the Hindus from being converted to Christianity in the early nineteenth century and Meherullah saved the Muslims from being proselytized to Christianity in the late Nineteenth century."

He did not strive for fame, he worked to spread truth to a hungry, devastated population that was being blinded by missionaries. E M School in Jessore was renamed as Munshi Meherulla Academy in his honor. , A railway station in Jessore was named after him. Bangladesh published a stamp of face value 2 taka in his honor in 1995.

See also
 Shaikh Jamiruddin

References 

Bengali Muslim scholars of Islam
1861 births
1907 deaths
People from Jhenaidah District
19th-century Bengalis